Bergin's Law is a grammatical law of Old Irish. It is named for the linguist Osborn Bergin (1873–1950), who identified it.

Bergin's Law states that while in Old Irish the normal order of a sentence is verb-subject-object, it is permissible for the verb, in the conjunct form, to appear at the end of the sentence.

References

Irish grammar